The Damon Runyon Cancer Fund Tournament was a golf tournament on the LPGA Tour, played only in 1954. It was played at Prince George's Golf Course in Landover, Maryland. Babe Zaharias won the event.

References

External links
Damon Runyon Cancer Research Foundation

Former LPGA Tour events
Golf in Maryland
Landover, Maryland
Women's sports in Maryland